Drigg and Carleton is a civil parish located in the Borough of Copeland, Cumbria, England.  It contains eight listed buildings that are recorded in the National Heritage List for England.  All the listed buildings are designated at Grade II, the lowest of the three grades, which is applied to "buildings of national importance and special interest".  The parish contains the villages of Drigg and Holmrook and the surrounding countryside.  All the listed buildings are houses or farmhouses and associated structures.


Buildings

References

Citations

Sources

Lists of listed buildings in Cumbria